The 2018 Patriot League women's soccer tournament was the postseason women's soccer tournament for the Patriot League held from October 30 through November 4, 2018. The quarterfinals of the tournament will be held at campus sites, while the semifinals and final took place at Nickerson Field in Boston, Massachusetts. The six-team single-elimination tournament consisted of three rounds based on seeding from regular season conference play. The defending champions were the Bucknell Bison, however they were unable to defend their crown, losing to Lehigh 2–1 in the first round.  The tournament was won by the Boston University Terriers, who were the #1 seed and defeated Lehigh 1–0 in the final. The conference championship was the fourth for the Boston University women's soccer program, all of which have come under coach Nancy Feldman.

Bracket

Schedule

Quarterfinals

Semifinals

Final

Statistics

Goalscorers 
2 Goals
Shannon Keefe - Boston

1 Goal
 Kayla Arestivo  - Lehigh
 Gabby Bair - Bucknell
 Ally Friedman - Lehigh
 Anna Heilferty - Boston
 Erynn Johns - Army
 McKenna Kennedy - Boston
 Sabrina Mertz  - Lehigh
 Courtney Supp  - Lehigh
 Adrienne Vaughn - Colgate

All-Tournament team

Source:

See also 
 2018 Patriot League Men's Soccer Tournament

References

External links 
2018 Women's Soccer Championship

 
Patriot League Women's Soccer Tournament